The Office of the Attorney General of the Northern Mariana Islands provides "legal counsel and representation to the...government and its agencies in many issues vital to the people’s interest.  These issues include the protection of children from abuse and neglect, preservation of the environment, protecting the Commonwealth’s financial assets, the protection of consumers, and public safety." The office has the following divisions:

 Administrative Services
 Child Support Enforcement
 Civil Division
 Consumer Protection
 Criminal Division
 Investigative Division
 Solicitor’s Division

List of attorneys general (1978-present) 
 Michael D'Angelo (1978)
 +James E. Sinding (1979–1981)
 Peter Van Name Esser (1982–1983)
 +Rexford C. Kosack (1983–1986)
 Alexandro C. Castro (1986–1989)
 Edward E. Manibusan (1989–1990)
 Robert C. Naraja (1990–1994)
 +Richard Weil (1994–1995)
 +Loren A. Sutton (1995) [Acting]
 Cizo Sebastian Aloot (1995–1996) [Acting]
 Robert B. Dunlap (1996–1998) [Acting]
 Sally B. Pfund (1998) [Acting]
 +Maya B. Kara (1998–2000) [Acting]
 +Herbert D. Soll (2000–2002)
 Robert T. Torres (2002)
 Ramona V. Mangloña (2002–2003)
 Pamela S. Brown (2003–2005)
 Matthew T. Gregory (2006–2008)
 Gregory V. Baka (2008–2009) [Acting]
 Edward T. Buckingham, III (2009–2012)
 Ellsbeth Viola Alepuyo (2012) [Acting]
 Joey P. San Nicolas (2012–2014)
 Gilbert J. Birnbrich (2014–2015)
 Edward E. Manibusan (2015–present)
+ Deceased
Persons who served as Acting Attorney General for less than 30 days total, or during the term of a Senate-confirmed or elected AG, are omitted.

See also 
 Attorney general
 Justice ministry
United States Department of Justice

References 

Attorneys General of the Northern Mariana Islands
Attorneys general
Justice ministries